Sara Rahbar (born 1976) is a contemporary artist. Her work ranges from photography to sculpture to installation, all of which reveal and transform the artist's personal experiences and are intimately autobiographical. Her work explores concepts of nationalism, separation and belonging - driven by central ideas of pain, violence and the complexity of the human condition. Compelled by an instinctual obsession to piece together and dissect, her approach is reflective of her need to deconstruct her emotions and memories. 

She constructs her work using collected objects such as; military personal memorabilia, flags, weapons, tools and various collected objects.  Sewing them onto textiles and attaching them to wood and metal. As the collected objects begin to get larger and heavier the canvases become tougher and more densely constructed until the objects take over and take on a life of their own. Very organically, the work becomes predominantly sculpture, the results carrying both literal and metaphoric weight. There is a juxtaposition between the iconographic elements that are ever-present in her work and the materials that she actively collects. It narrates a dialogue that directly ties to the objects and symbols in which we place faith. Her many compositions form and act as a tangible, physical cacophony of the relationship between individual and society. She is based in New York.

Biography 
Sara Rahbar was born in 1976 in Tehran, Iran. In 1982, Rahbar and her family left Iran in the beginning of the Iranian Revolution and the early stages of the Iran-Iraq War, These experiences left many traumatic memories that have influenced her work.

Rahbar studied at Fashion Institute of Technology from 1996 until 2000 and in 2004 she continued her education at Central Saint Martins College of Art and Design in London.

The first body of work that created international recognition for the artist was the Flag Series (2005–2019), in which traditional fabrics and objects are reworked as collages that form various incarnations of the American and Iranian flag, exploring ideas of national belonging, as well as the conflicting role of flags as symbols of ideological and nationalistic violence.

Rahbar's work is in various public museum collections including Centre Pompidou, British Museum, Davis Museum at Wellesley College, among others.

Solo exhibitions
2020 – The space between us, Carbon 12,  Dubai, United Arab Emirates
2019 – Nada House, Governors Island, New York, United States
2018 – Carry me home, Dallas Contemporary, Dallas, Texas, United States
2017 – Salvation, Carbon 12, Dubai, United Arab Emirates
2014 – Swarming, Carbon 12, Dubai, United Arab Emirates 
2012 – Restless Violence, Carbon 12, Dubai, United Arab Emirates
2011 – I have no faith left for the devil to take, Sara Rahbar, Hilger Contemporary, Vienna, Austria
2010 – Whatever we had to lose we lost, and in a moonless sky we marched, Sara Rahbar, Carbon 12, Dubai, United Arab Emirates
2009 – Contradicting Realities: Recent works by Sara Rahbar, Tyler Art Gallery at SUNY Oswego, New York, United States

Group exhibitions

2016 – 2050 A Brief History of the Future, Palazzo Reale, Milano, Italy The Royal Museums of Fine Arts of Belgium, Belgium and the National Museum of Fine Arts, Taiwan.
2015 – 56th Venice Biennale, Iran Pavilion, Venice, Italy
2014 – The Shade of the Moon, Changwon Sculpture Biennial, Korea
2013 – Aya Haidar, Huda Lutfi, Sara Rahbar, bischoff/weiss gallery, London, England
2013 – Sharjah Biennial 11, Re:emerge Towards a New Cultural Cartography, Sharjah, United Arab Emirates

References

External links
 Sara Rahbar's official website
 Video: Sara Rahbar's BBC Interview (in English) from 2014
 Sara Rahbar articles on Saatchi Gallery

1976 births
Living people
People from Tehran
21st-century Iranian artists
Artists from New York City
Alumni of Central Saint Martins
Fashion Institute of Technology alumni
Iranian contemporary artists
American contemporary artists
Iranian sculptors
21st-century Iranian women artists
Assemblage artists
American sculptors
American artists of Iranian descent